Micropeplus is a genus of rove beetles in the family Staphylinidae. There are at least 40 described species in Micropeplus.

Species
These 42 species belong to the genus Micropeplus:

 Micropeplus browni  g b
 Micropeplus brunneus  g
 Micropeplus caelatus  g
 Micropeplus calabricus  g
 Micropeplus clypeatus  c g
 Micropeplus cribratus  g b
 Micropeplus dentatus  c g
 Micropeplus doderoi  g
 Micropeplus fulvus  c g
 Micropeplus gomerensis  g
 Micropeplus graecus  g
 Micropeplus jason g
 Micropeplus laevipennis  c g
 Micropeplus laticollis  g b
 Micropeplus latus  g
 Micropeplus longipennis  c g
 Micropeplus marietti  g
 Micropeplus minor  g
 Micropeplus neotomae b
 Micropeplus nitidipennis  c g
 Micropeplus nomurai  c g
 Micropeplus obscurus  c g
 Micropeplus obsoletus  g
 Micropeplus parvulus g
 Micropeplus piankouensis g
 Micropeplus porcatus  g
 Micropeplus punctatus  b
 Micropeplus ripicola  g
 Micropeplus robustus  g
 Micropeplus rougemonti  c g
 Micropeplus sculptus  g b
 Micropeplus shanghaiensis  c g
 Micropeplus sinensis  c g
 Micropeplus sinuatus  c g
 Micropeplus smetanai  g
 Micropeplus spinatus  c g
 Micropeplus staphylinoides  g
 Micropeplus taiwanensis  c g
 Micropeplus tesserula b
 Micropeplus uenoi  c g
 Micropeplus yunnanus  c g
 Micropeplus yushanensis  c g

Data sources: i = Integrated Taxonomic Information System, c = Catalogue of Life, g = Global Biodiversity Information Facility, b = Bugguide.net

Fossil species 
 †Micropeplus hoogendorni  Imuruk Volcanics Formation, Alaska, Messinian
 †Micropeplus hopkinsi   Imuruk Volcanics Formation, Alaska, Messinian
 †Micropeplus macrofulvus  Willershausen, Germany, Piacenzian
 †Micropeplus pengweii  Burmese amber, Myanmar, Cenomanian

References

Further reading

External links
 

Staphylinidae